Frank Spencer Sutton (October 23, 1923 – June 28, 1974) was an American actor best remembered for his role as  Gunnery Sergeant Vince Carter on the CBS television series Gomer Pyle, U.S.M.C..

Early life
Born in Clarksville, Tennessee, Sutton developed an interest in acting, playing his first role at age nine and also starring in the drama club at East Nashville High School, where he graduated in 1941. He later said, "The first time I walked out on a stage, I had a warm feeling. I knew then I wanted to be an actor."

After high school, Sutton returned to Clarksville to become a radio announcer. During World War II he volunteered for service in the Marine Corps, but he was medically rejected due to his color blindness. He then enlisted in the U.S. Army and served in the South Pacific, taking part in 14 assault landings. Sutton was a sergeant who served from 1943 to 1946 in the 293rd Joint Assault Signal Company. He was awarded the Bronze Star and Purple Heart.

Acting career
Honorably discharged after the war as a sergeant, he began acting on stage. He attended the Columbia University School of General Studies, graduating cum laude with a bachelor's degree in drama in 1952.

Throughout the 1950s and early 1960s, Sutton played small roles in television shows such as Decoy, Route 66, Naked City, The Greatest Show on Earth, The Fugitive, The Goldbergs, 87th Precinct, Gunsmoke, Target: The Corruptors, Empire, The Twilight Zone, and The Untouchables. He had a continuing role as Cadet Eric Rattison, the great rival of the Polaris Unit manned by the series' heroes, in Tom Corbett, Space Cadet from 1950 to 1955. In 1955, he received his big break in the Academy Award-winning movie Marty, in which he played the title character's friend, Ralph. He also had a role in The Satan Bug, a 1965 spy thriller. He returned to the stage in The Andersonville Trial in the early 1960s.

Having primarily acted in dramas, Sutton's breakthrough role was on Gomer Pyle, U.S.M.C., a 1964 episode of The Andy Griffith Show, in which he played the cynical and easily exasperated Gunnery Sergeant Vince Carter opposite Jim Nabors' character Gomer Pyle. This episode was the pilot for a spin-off TV comedy, Gomer Pyle, USMC, where Sutton continued the role for five seasons, until the show ended its run in 1969. He also appeared in public service announcements in the role of Gunnery Sergeant Carter. After Gomer Pyle ceased production, Sutton appeared regularly on Nabors' variety show The Jim Nabors Hour with Gomer Pyle co-star Ronnie Schell. Sutton played the brother-in-law of Nabors' character in comedy sketches. Sutton performed in dinner theater, playing, among other roles, the father in Norman, Is That You? and made guest appearances on other television programs.

Personal life and death
In 1946, Sutton married soap-opera writer Toby M. Igler, with whom he had two children, Joe Sutton and Amanda.

On June 28, 1974, while preparing for a performance in the comedy play Luv at the Beverly Barn Dinner Playhouse in Shreveport, Louisiana, Sutton died of a heart attack. He is buried in the Greenwood Cemetery in his hometown of Clarksville, Tennessee.

Filmography

See also
 List of Gomer Pyle, U.S.M.C. characters
 List of people from Tennessee

References

External links

 
 
 
 Obituary on National Obituary Archive
 Several dozen articles about Frank Sutton

1923 births
1974 deaths
20th-century American male actors
United States Army personnel of World War II
American male film actors
American male soap opera actors
American male television actors
Burials in Tennessee
Columbia University School of General Studies alumni
Male actors from Tennessee
People from Clarksville, Tennessee
United States Army non-commissioned officers